An endmember (also end-member or end member) in mineralogy is a mineral that is at the extreme end of a mineral series in terms of purity of its chemical composition. Minerals often can be described as solid solutions with varying compositions of some chemical elements, rather than as substances with an exact chemical formula. There may be two or more endmembers in a  group or series of minerals. 

As another example, the tectosilicate feldspar can be described as a solid solution of the endmembers K-feldspar [KAlSi3O8], albite [NaAlSi3O8] and anorthite [CaAl2Si2O8]. A specific feldspar can have varying quantities of potassium (K), sodium (Na) and calcium (Ca).

See also
 Larvikite

References

Mineralogy